Nolina beldingii is a species of perennial flowering plant in the family Asparagaceae known commonly as the Cape nolina or Belding's beargrass. This species is endemic to Baja California Sur in Mexico, where it grows only in the highest reaches of the Sierra de la Laguna. It is found primarily in oak forests at elevations over  along rocky granite outcrops.

Description 
This is an arborescent species of Nolina that grows  in height with a trunk  in diameter. The bark is colored gray but turns maroon with age. Topping the apex of the trunk(s) are 1 to 26 rosettes of leaves, each rosette  in diameter. The rosettes retain persistent old leaves along the trunks. The leaves are colored dark green and are smooth, sometimes becoming reddish towards the back.

The pistillate flowers are also shaped campanulate, on pedicels , colored light yellow to cream with a reddish midvein.

Taxonomy 

This species was first discovered to Western science by Lyman Belding, a naturalist who made several ornithological expeditions to the Sierra de la Laguna. Townshend Stith Brandegee made the species description in 1890 as Nolina beldingi, naming it after Belding, who gave Brandegee the directions to find the plant. Brandegee noted that a local species of wasp frequently nested in the plant, which almost ended his attempts to gather fruit on a precarious cliff-side specimen. He also compared the similarity of this species to the Dracaena planted ornamentally in San Francisco. Brandegee did not mention any type specimen in his description, meaning that a specimen collected in 1893 serves as the lectotype.

Distribution and habitat 
This species is endemic to the Sierra de la Laguna, a mountain range in the Cape region of Baja California Sur, Mexico. It is predominantly found on the steep slopes and cliffs of the local oak and pine forests, growing in association with Quercus tuberculata, Q. devia, Q. arizonica and Arbutus peninsularis. It is also found growing with the rare Dudleya rigida. Brandegee described this species as "the most striking part of the vegetation" amongst the oaks and pines.

Uses 
This leaves from this species are reportedly used as thatching by the local peoples. Members of the genus Nolina are also utilized by indigenous peoples to make mats, basketry, and hats. In parts of Arizona, New Mexico, Sonora and Chihuahua, the leaves of Nolina species are used to make brooms.

References

External links 

 

Trees of Baja California Sur
Taxa named by Townshend Stith Brandegee
Endemic flora of Mexico
Natural history of the Peninsular Ranges
Plants described in 1890
beldingii